The Mohidden Mosque, also known as the Ujra Mosque, is a  mosque located on Kavaratti Island in Lakshadweep, a territory of India. It is a famous Islami mosque 

A well in the precincts of the mosque contains water with curative powers.

History
Mohidden Mosque lies to the Northwest of the island. The 17th century structure has an ornate ceiling, said to have been carved out of a single of driftwood.

Design
Mohidden Mosque's pillars are intricately carved. Sheikh Mohammad Kasim's grave is located in the mosque and is revered by the islanders.

Intricate driftwood carvings along the interiors bear a legend. According to legend, inspiration was drawn from the leaf of a plant and when the carver thought of recreating it in his house, a piece of wood hit his eyes and he lost his sight.

References

Mosques in Lakshadweep
Buildings and structures in Lakshadweep
17th-century mosques